Buena Vista, or Bard's Field on Trinity Manor, is a historic home located at Leonardtown, St. Mary's County, Maryland, United States. It is a -story, three-bay, Greek Revival-style frame dwelling with a 2-story, three-bay, frame, wing. It was built between 1840 and 1850, for George and Mary C. Combs.

Buena Vista was listed on the National Register of Historic Places in 1998.

References

External links
, including photo from 1996, at Maryland Historical Trust

Houses on the National Register of Historic Places in Maryland
Houses in St. Mary's County, Maryland
Greek Revival houses in Maryland
Houses completed in 1850
National Register of Historic Places in St. Mary's County, Maryland